Langenwetzendorf is a municipality in the district of Greiz, in Thuringia, Germany.

History
Within the German Empire (1871-1918), Langenwetzendorf was part of the Principality of Reuss-Gera. In January 2023 Langenwetzendorf absorbed the former municipality Kühdorf.

References

External links
 Langenwetzendorf (East of Thuringia/Vogtland): location, history, tips for trips and events

Municipalities in Thuringia
Greiz (district)
Principality of Reuss-Gera